The American Society for Cell Biology's highest honor for Public Service, the ASCB Public Service Award is for outstanding national leadership in support of biomedical research. The awardees are selected by the ASCB Public Policy Committee.

Awardees
Source: ASCB
2019 James F. Deatherage
2018 Senator Roy Blunt (R-Mo) and Representative Tom Cole (R-OK)
2016 Senator Richard Durbin
2014 Rush Holt Jr. 
2013 Jeremy Berg 
2012 Keith Yamamoto 
2010 Tom Pollard
2009 Larry Goldstein 
2008 Maxine Singer
2007 Representative Michael N. Castle (R-DE)
2006 Barbara Forrest and Ken Miller
2005 Senator Arlen Specter (R-PA)
2004 Elizabeth Blackburn
2003 Paul Berg
2002 Matthew Meselson
2001 Christopher Reeve
2000 Donna Shalala, US Health & Human Services Secretary
1999 Harold Varmus
1998 J. Michael Bishop
1997 Representative George Gekas (R-PA)
1996 Marc Kirschner
1995 Representative John Porter (R-IL)
1994 Senator Tom Harkin (D-IA)

See also
 List of biomedical science awards

External links
ASCB Public Service Award

References

American Society for Cell Biology
Biomedical awards